During 1965–66 Football Club Internazionale competed in Serie A, Coppa Italia and European Cup.

Summary 
After won the European Cup last season, the club made just few transfers in to the team such as young players Cordova and Facco, also Cappellini back to the squad. Manager Herrera confirm La Grande Inter, with a substantial change: defender Facchetti moved to the left back and made numerous contributions in attacking., notably his capacity to finish and scoring goals. Facchetti held the record for most goals in a single Serie A season by a defender, with 10 goals scored during this season, until it was broken by Perugia' Marco Materazzi during the 2000–01 season.

The team also won the 1965 Intercontinental Cup against Independiente de Avellaneda. The first leg was held on 8 September at San Siro, Inter won the match 3–0, with goals from Joaquín Peiró and Sandro Mazzola. La Doble Visera hosted the return leg 7 days later on 15 September 1965, and ended in a goalless draw. Internazionale thus won the Intercontinental Cup for the second year in a row.

The team being title holders in European Cup advanced to the semi-finals, where lost to Real Madrid with a 1–3 score after two legs.

Squad

Transfers

Competitions

Serie A

League table

Results by round

Matches

European Cup

Eightfinals

Quarterfinals

Semifinals

Intercontinental Cup

First leg

Second leg

Coppa Italia

Quarterfinals

Semifinals

Statistics

Squad statistics

Player statistics

References

See also
Grande Inter

1965-1966
Italian football championship-winning seasons
Internazionale